was a Japanese samurai, the ninth son of Mōri Motonari. His mother was Motonari's concubine, Nomi no Ōkata (乃美の方). 

Originally he was named Mototsuna and given to Ōta Hidetsuna but later his childless half-brother Kobayakawa Takakage took him as his adopted son. After this he changed his name to Motofusa. When he became one of Toyotomi Hideyoshi's hostages for some years and granted to use a kanji from Hideyoshi's name, he changed his name again to Hidekane. He married Ōtomo Sōrin's daughter Maxentia (Katsurahime) and converted to Catholic Christianity with the baptized name Simao Findenao (シマオ・フィンデナオ).

After the Sekigahara Campaign, Hidekane changed his family name back to Mōri, to avoid shame caused by his stepbrother Kobayakawa Hideaki. He died young at 35 years old.

Hidekane was known of his gunnery skill, and Tachibana Muneshige's sworn brother. Together with him and other Toyotomi loyalists, Hidekane participated in Siege of Ōtsu Castle.

Samurai
1567 births
1601 deaths
Mōri clan
Japanese Roman Catholics
Converts to Christianity
Deified Japanese people